= Biljana's Springs =

Springs in North Macedonia

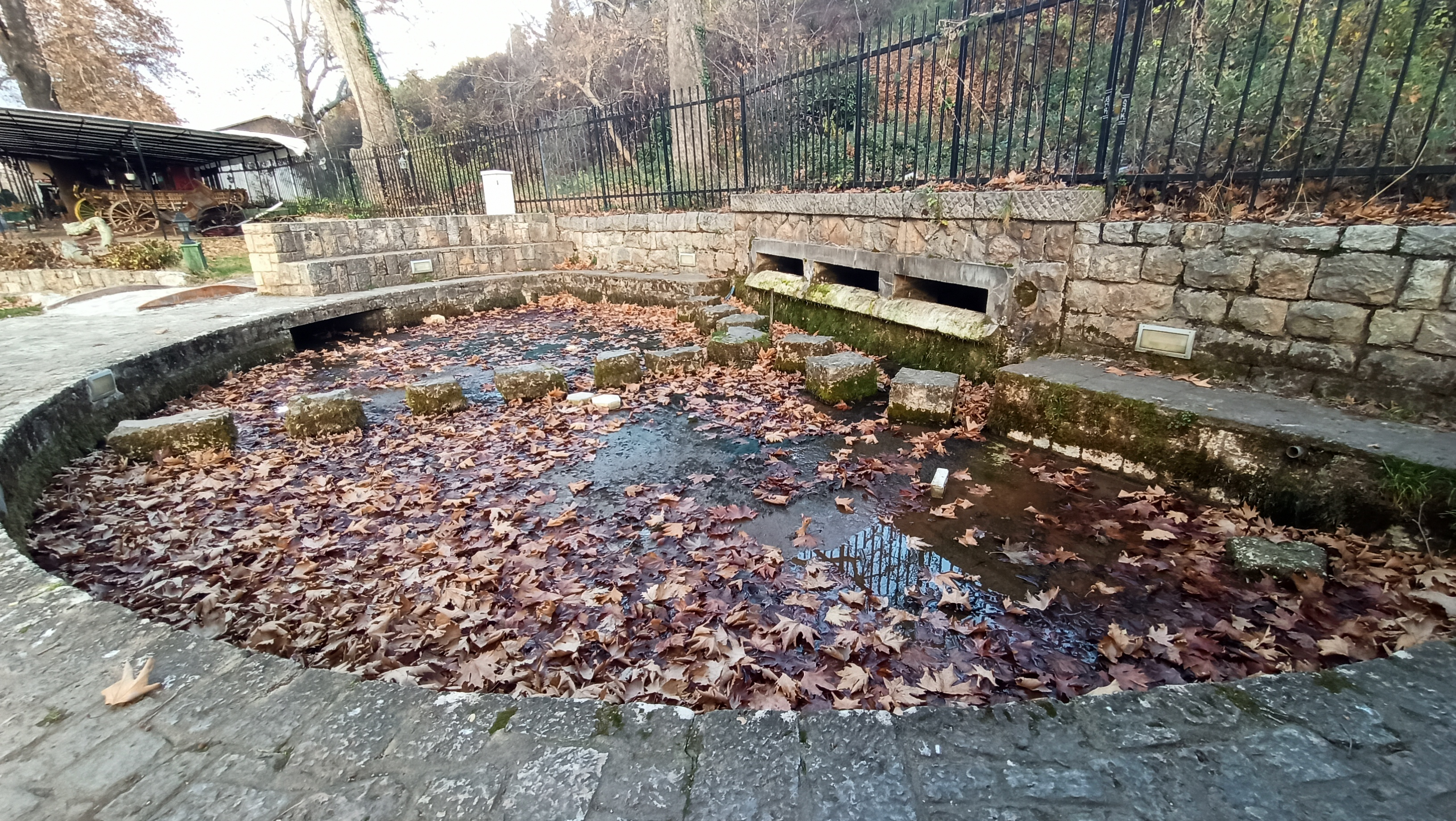
Biljana's Springs in December 2020

Biljana's Springs (Macedonian: Билјанини Извори, romanized: Biljanini Izvori) is a spring in Ohrid, North Macedonia, renowned for the legends around it. Biljana's Springs is the source of water at the pool which is above the openings where it flows. One part of the pool is used for the needs of the water supply in Ohrid, and another part is used for the Hydrobiological Institute for the artificial growing of young fish and ensuring clean water. Once those needs are fulfilled, the excess of water is flowing outside of the openings of Biljana's Springs.

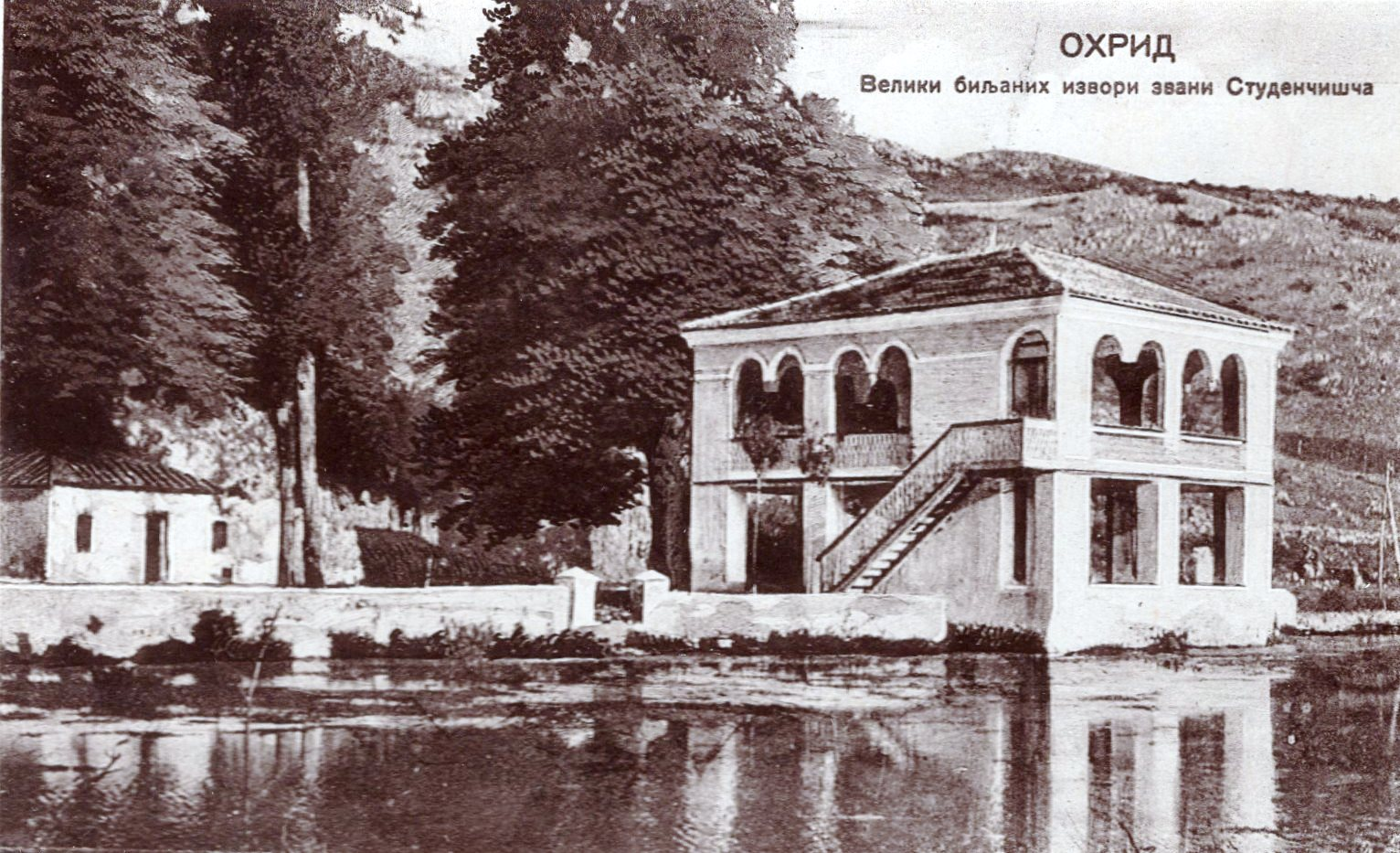
A postcard from 1930

The site at Biljana's Springs and the springs themselves are being visited by approximately 100.000 local and foreign tourists.
